Michel Rosier (1951–2004) was a French historian of economics.

Works
 L'Etat expérimentateur. Paris: Presses universitaires de France, 1993.
 (ed. with Lucien Gillard) François Simiand (1873-1935): sociologie, histoire, économie. Amsterdam: Ed. des Archives contemporaines, 1996.

References

1951 births
2004 deaths
Historians of economic thought